Stephen Robert McAllister (born November 27, 1962) is an American attorney, academic, and former government official. He served as the United States Attorney for the District of Kansas from 2018 to 2021. He also serves as the E.S. & Tom W. Hampton Distinguished Professor of Law at the University of Kansas School of Law. He was formerly the Solicitor General of Kansas.

A graduate of the University of Kansas and the University of Kansas School of Law, McAllister clerked for Richard Posner of the United States Court of Appeals for the Seventh Circuit and  Clarence Thomas and Byron R. White of the United States Supreme Court . After law school, he worked in private practice in the Washington D.C. office of Gibson, Dunn & Crutcher. He also served as the interim director of the Robert J. Dole Institute of Politics from 2003 to 2004.

McAllister has argued nine times before the U.S. Supreme Court. He currently teaches federal and state constitutional law and federal civil rights law at the University of Kansas School of Law. He first joined the school's faculty in 1993. He was the dean of the University of Kansas School of Law from 2000 to 2005. He served as the Solicitor General of Kansas from 2007 to 2018, after previously serving as the Solicitor of the State of Kansas from 1999 to 2003.

On February 8, 2021, he along with 55 other Trump-era attorneys were asked to resign. He resigned on February 28, 2021.

See also 
 List of law clerks of the Supreme Court of the United States (Seat 6)
 List of law clerks of the Supreme Court of the United States (Seat 10)

References

External links

 Biography at U.S. Department of Justice
 Biography at University of Kansas School of Law

Living people
University of Kansas alumni
University of Kansas School of Law alumni
University of Kansas faculty
21st-century American lawyers
Kansas lawyers
Solicitors General of Kansas
United States Attorneys for the District of Kansas
Law clerks of the Supreme Court of the United States
People associated with Gibson Dunn
1962 births